Dolenji Vrh is a small settlement in the hills south of Trebnje in eastern Slovenia. The area is part of the historical Lower Carniola region. The entire Municipality of Trebnje is now included in the Southeast Slovenia Statistical Region.

References

External links
Dolenji Vrh at Geopedia

Populated places in the Municipality of Trebnje